Åtvidabergs Fotbollförening, also known simply as Åtvidabergs FF, Åtvidaberg, Åtvid or (especially locally) ÅFF, is a Swedish professional football club based in Åtvidaberg. The club is affiliated with Östergötlands Fotbollförbund and plays their home games at Kopparvallen. The club colours, reflected in their crest and kit, are blue and white. Formed on 1 July 1907 as Åtvidabergs IF, the club was most successful during the 1970s when they won two national championship titles and two national cup titles. With a population of around 7,000, Åtvidaberg is the smallest town ever to bring home a Swedish league title. They currently play in Division 1, where the season lasts from April to November.

History

Initial rise through the divisions

During the 1920s, the small town club Åtvidabergs IF played in the fifth tier of Swedish football. However, local businessman Elof Ericsson was determined to change this. He became chairman of the board and took the initiative of separating the different sections of the multisport club, thus forming a new club, Åtvidabergs FF, out of the football section. Through his company Facit, which employed a large portion of the small Åtvidaberg population, he was also able to increase the funding for the team.

Åtvidaberg became early forerunners with their strategy to scout players nationally instead of just locally. Since all players in Sweden at the time were amateurs, their ability to offer new signings a good job at the Facit factory made them an attractive club to play for. This, together with the hiring of foreign coaches like Kálmán Konrád, helped the club move up through the divisions, establishing them in the second tier and playing one year in Allsvenskan.

The peak of Åtvidaberg's success

The years that followed would prove to be Åtvidabergs FF's most successful ever. During this period, they recruited players like Ralf Edström, Roland Sandberg and Conny Torstensson.

In 1967, they were promoted to Allsvenskan and five years later they won the league for the first time ever and repeated the year after in 1973. Ironically, this golden age came at exactly the same time as the Facit company, which had enabled the success, struggled greatly and eventually was sold off to Electrolux.

New millennium revival

After struggling greatly in the 1990s and falling as low as the fourth tier with attendance numbers in the hundreds, Åtvidaberg had managed to climb back up to the second tier again by the start of the new millennium. In an effort to further strengthen their organization and finances, the club started a cooperation with reigning champions Djurgårdens IF in 2003. The deal also included a loan of several Djurgården players to Åtvidaberg. In 2005, the Djurgården chairman said that the team should move to the nearby city of Linköping, that did not have a club in the higher divisions. The proposal was met by a negative reaction from the Åtvidaberg supporters. The cooperation finally collapsed in 2006 when Åtvidaberg Municipality refused to cover any potential economic losses for Djurgården.

In the following years, Åtvidaberg finished in the top half of the Superettan table and finally in 2009 they were promoted back to Allsvenskan for the first time since 1982. They were relegated again but bounced back immediately and achieved an eighth-place finish in the 2012 Allsvenskan. During the upcoming seasons, Åtvidaberg finished mid-table in the top tier with the help of the three key players that long had stayed faithful with the club: goalkeeper Henrik Gustavsson (that made 487 league appearances between 1997 and 2015), central defender Daniel Hallingström (350 appearances and 29 goals between 1999–2000 and 2002–2015) and midfielder Kristian Bergström (489 appearances and 118 goals between 1992–1997	and 2004–2015). All three players retired after the 2015 season, as Åtvidaberg finished 16th and last in Allsvenskan and got relegated back to Superettan.

Two years later, in 2017, the club got relegated from Superettan to the third tier, Division 1.

Players

First-team squad

Youth players in use

Management

Technical staff
As of 10 July 2018

Achievements

 Swedish Champions
 Winners (2): 1972, 1973

League
 Allsvenskan:
 Winners (2): 1972, 1973
 Runners-up (2): 1970, 1971
 Superettan:
 Winners (1): 2011
 Runners-up (1): 2009

Cups
 Svenska Cupen:
 Winners (2): 1969–70, 1970–71
 Runners-up (4): 1946, 1972–73, 1978–79, 2005

Managers

 Kálmán Konrád (1942–1947)
 Erik Almgren (1948)
 József Nagy (1948–1952)
 George Raynor (1952–1954)
 Karl Durspekt (1956–1957)
 Antonio Durán (1960–1963)
 Bengt Gustavsson (1966–1970)
 Sven-Agne Larsson (1971–1972)
 Ottó Dombos (1973–1974)
 Ingvar Svensson (1977–1979)
 Björn Westerberg (Jan 1979 – Dec 1982)
 Bo-Leine Larsson
 Conny Torstensson (1986)
 Håkan Stenbäck (1989)
 Mats "Tott" Karlsson (1997 – 1999)
 Jörgen Augustsson (2000)
 Steve Creutz & Hans "Lerdala" Andersson (2000–2003)
 Kent Karlsson (2004 – 2006)
 Peter Swärdh (2007 – 2008)
 Daniel Wiklund (2009)
 Andreas Thomsson (2010 – 2012)
 Peter Swärdh (2013 – 2014)
 Roar Hansen (2015 – 2017)
 Andreas Thomsson (2017)
 Daniel Hallingström & Pontus Hydén (2018)
 Håkan Juhlin (2018)
 Rickard Johansson (2018 – 2019)
 Tor-Arne Fredheim (2019)
 Jesper Ny (2019 – present)

Footnotes

Notes

External links
 
 Kopparslagarna – official supporter club site

 
Football clubs in Östergötland County
Allsvenskan clubs
Association football clubs established in 1907
Sport in Östergötland County
1907 establishments in Sweden
Svenska Cupen winners